Caterham Racing,  formerly EQ8 Caterham Racing and Caterham Team AirAsia was a motor racing team competing in the GP2 Series and GP2 Asia Series. It was created by Tony Fernandes, who was also responsible for the revival of the Lotus name in Formula 1 in 2010 with the creation of the Lotus Racing team. Team AirAsia was officially accepted to the GP2 Series grid on 21 September 2010, along with fellow debutants Carlin Motorsport, filling the gap left by the departures of Durango and DPR. The team made their debut at the first round of the 2010–11 GP2 Asia Series.

In addition to being owned by the Caterham Group that owned Caterham F1 Team, Caterham Racing shared deep technical links with its Formula One parent team. The GP2 operation was embedded within the Formula One operation and base, and the two teams shared the same technical staff. Caterham Racing's (then Team Air Asia) drivers also served as Caterham F1 Team's (then called Team Lotus) test and reserve drivers in the 2011 Formula One season.

The outfit was originally called Team AirAsia. The Caterham designation was added to the official name in June 2011, following Fernandes' purchase of the company. For the 2012 season the team was again renamed as Caterham Racing to coincide with the renaming of the Formula 1 outfit.

In October 2014 GP3 Series team Status Grand Prix acquired the team from Tony Fernandes. The team still operated under the Caterham name for the remainder of the 2014 season and starting from 2015 the team became known as Status Grand Prix.

Racing history

2011 season

For its first year in GP2, Caterham signed the experienced duo of Luiz Razia and Davide Valsecchi for both the Asia Series and main series seasons. Both drivers also became test drivers for Tony Fernandes's Formula One team, at this stage known as Team Lotus, and took part in a number of Friday free practice sessions during the F1 season.  After finishing seventh in the teams' championship in the truncated Asia Series, Valsecchi began the main series strongly, scoring points six times in the first eight races of the year, including the team's first victory in the feature race at Monaco, which propelled him into contention for the drivers' championship. However, he then failed to score during the remainder of the season, dropping him to eight overall. Razia took over as the team's driving force, securing Caterham's first pole position at the Hungaroring and ending the season twelfth in the standings. The team finished sixth in the teams' championship, well ahead of fellow debutantes Carlin.

Caterham's livery began the season with AirAsia's red-and-white, but switched mid-season to be more in-line with the Team Lotus.

2012 season 
In January 2012, it was announced that Caterham would be proposed moving to the Leafield Technical Centre (the previous headquarters of the Arrows and Super Aguri F1 teams) in Leafield, Oxfordshire, with its parent F1 team, now renamed as the Caterham F1 Team and Caterham Cars. And in August 2012, Caterham Racing GP2 eventually completed its relocation to Leafield Technical Centre along with Caterham F1 Team and Caterham Cars.

On the driving front, both Razia and Valsecchi moved to other teams and were replaced by Rodolfo González (who tested for the F1 team in ) and Giedo van der Garde. In a continuation of the previous season's policy, Van der Garde also became the Caterham F1 team's test and reserve driver. Following the abandonment of the Asia Series, both drivers competed in an expanded main series season: team leader Van der Garde scored a brace of race victories, pole positions and fastest laps, but failed to trouble the championship protagonists and finished the year sixth overall, whilst González picked up six points and finished in 22nd position. Caterham dropped one position in the teams' championship to seventh.

Results

GP2 Series

GP2 Asia Series

In detail

GP2 Series 
(key) (Races in bold indicate pole position) (Races in italics indicate fastest lap)

GP2 Asia Series

References

External links 

Malaysian auto racing teams
AirAsia
GP2 Series teams
Racing
Tune Group
Auto racing teams established in 2010
Auto racing teams disestablished in 2014